United Nations Security Council resolution 1069, adopted unanimously on 30 July 1996, after recalling previous resolutions on Croatia including Resolution 1037 (1996) which established the United Nations Transitional Authority for Eastern Slavonia, Baranja and Western Sirmium (UNTAES) and Resolution 1043 (1996) authorising the deployment of military observers, the Council extended the deployment of 100 military observers with UNTAES for a further six months until 15 January 1997.

See also
 Bosnian War
 Breakup of Yugoslavia
 Croatian War of Independence
 Dayton Agreement
 List of United Nations Security Council Resolutions 1001 to 1100 (1995–1997)
 Yugoslav Wars
 United Nations Transitional Authority for Eastern Slavonia, Baranja and Western Sirmium
 Eastern Slavonia, Baranja and Western Syrmia (1995–1998)
 Joint Council of Municipalities

References

External links
 
Text of the Resolution at undocs.org

 1069
 1069
1996 in Yugoslavia
1996 in Croatia
 1069
Joint Council of Municipalities
July 1996 events